North Lake School is a public school in Silver Lake, Oregon, United States that serves kindergarten through twelfth grade (K-12). It is the only school in the North Lake School District, which serves Silver Lake, Christmas Valley, and Fort Rock. The current school building opened in 1991.

Academics
In 2008, 67% of the school's seniors received a high school diploma. Of 15 students, ten graduated, two dropped out, and three received a modified diploma.

References

Education in Lake County, Oregon
High schools in Lake County, Oregon
Public middle schools in Oregon
Public high schools in Oregon
Public elementary schools in Oregon
1991 establishments in Oregon
School districts established in 1991